Robert Jan Westdijk (born 2 November 1964) is a Dutch film director. He was born in Utrecht. His 1995 directorial debut film, Little Sister, won a Golden Calf for Best Feature Film.

Filmography
Little Sister (1995, released in Dutch as )
 (1996, TV movie)
Siberia (1998)
 (1998, TV short)
Phileine Says Sorry (2003)
In Real Life (2008)
The Dinner Club (2010)
Waterboys (2016)

Awards
Little Sister (1995)
Golden Calf for Best Feature Film
Prize of the City of Utrecht at the Netherlands Film Festival
Jury Special Prize at the Torino International Festival of Young Cinema
Audience Award at the Torino International Festival of Young Cinema
Silver Alexander at the Thessaloniki Film Festival
Rembrandt Award for Best Film
Golden Tulip at the Istanbul International Film Festival (1996)
Procirep Award at the Angers European First Film Festival (1996)
In Real Life (2008)
Golden Calf for Best Editing
Golden Calf for Best Screenplay of a Feature Film
The Dinner Club (2010)
Golden Film

References

External links
 

1964 births
Living people
Dutch film directors
Mass media people from Utrecht (city)
21st-century Dutch people